Belkovich is a large lunar impact crater of the form termed a walled plain. The formation has been heavily eroded by a history of subsequent impacts, leaving it reshaped, worn, and the features softened and rounded. Belkovich is located along the northeastern limb of the Moon, and so its visibility is subject to libration effects. From the Earth this crater is viewed from the side, making it difficult to view it in detail.

Belkovich intrudes into the northeast portion of the Mare Humboldtianum, and the mare area outside the rim consists of hilly, irregular surface that covers much of the northern half of the lunar mare. The younger crater Hayn intrudes into the northwest rim of Belkovich, and the satellite crater Belkovich K lies across the northeast rim. In the south, the lava-flooded crater Belkovich A cuts across the southern rim, and its western rim is overlain in turn by the small, bowl-shaped Belkovich B.

Apart from the intersecting crater formations, the outer rim of Belkovich has been degraded and reshaped until it now consists of a roughly circular range of mountains and hills. The northern and northeastern parts of the crater floor and rim is an irregular surface of many small hillocks. The southeast quadrant of the interior is nearly as irregular, and contains a number of small craterlets. Only in the western part of the floor is the surface relatively flat. From here a slender rille extends to the east-southeast before bending to the southeast.

Satellite craters
By convention these features are identified on lunar maps by placing the letter on the side of the crater midpoint that is closest to Belkovich.

References

 
 
 
 
 
 
 
 
 
 
 
 

Impact craters on the Moon